Tiago de Leonço (born 11 November 1992) is a Brazilian professional footballer who currently plays for J2 League club JEF United Chiba.

Club career
Born in Novo Hamburgo, Leonço represented lower league clubs in his country. He moved abroad on 20 August 2013, and signed for Portuguese second tier club Santa Clara. On 2 February 2015, he switched to Leixões after being a free agent since the end of the previous season. In the following season, he moved to Farense. However, his contract was soon terminated on 19 January 2016.

On 31 July 2017, Leonço signed with Cypriot First Division club AEL Limassol after a stint with Danish second tier club Vendsyssel.

On 21 January 2018, Leonço signed with Hong Kong Premier League club R&F.

In September 2020, Leonço joined China League One club Beijing Renhe on loan. Despite scoring 8 goals in 17 league appearances, his performance was not enough to prevent Renhe's relegation from the second division.

On 8 March 2021, Leonço joined China Super League club Guangzhou City on a two-year deal.

References

External links

1992 births
Living people
Association football forwards
Brazilian footballers
Esporte Clube Novo Hamburgo players
C.D. Santa Clara players
Leixões S.C. players
S.C. Farense players
Vendsyssel FF players
AEL Limassol players
R&F (Hong Kong) players
Beijing Renhe F.C. players
Liga Portugal 2 players
Danish 1st Division players
Cypriot First Division players
Hong Kong Premier League players
China League One players
JEF United Chiba players
J2 League players
Brazilian expatriate footballers
Expatriate footballers in Hong Kong
Expatriate footballers in China
Brazilian expatriate sportspeople in Hong Kong
Brazilian expatriate sportspeople in China